Nicholas Haig (born 12 March 1987, in Christchurch) is a New Zealand field hockey player. At the 2012 Summer Olympics, he competed for the national team in the men's tournament.

Haig comes from a family of hockey players and began playing at the age of five.  He was part of the New Zealand team that won the bronze medal at the 2010 Commonwealth Games.

References

External links
 

1987 births
Living people
New Zealand male field hockey players
Field hockey players at the 2012 Summer Olympics
Olympic field hockey players of New Zealand
Field hockey players at the 2014 Commonwealth Games
People from Christchurch
Field hockey players at the 2010 Commonwealth Games
Commonwealth Games medallists in field hockey
Commonwealth Games bronze medallists for New Zealand
2010 Men's Hockey World Cup players
2014 Men's Hockey World Cup players
Medallists at the 2010 Commonwealth Games